Robert Haskell Hill (April 2, 1892 – December 28, 1942), aka War Horse, was a professional football player who played in the National Football League during the 1922 season. That season, he joined the NFL's Oorang Indians. The Indians were a team based in LaRue, Ohio, composed only of Native Americans, and coached by Jim Thorpe. Hill was a member of the Mohawks.

References

Uniform Numbers of the NFL

Notes

1890s births
1942 deaths
Native American players of American football
American football guards
Carlisle Indians football players
Oorang Indians players
Players of American football from Pennsylvania
People from Smethport, Pennsylvania